Stanisław Józef Blok DFC (1916-1994) was a Polish fighter ace of the Polish Air Force in World War II with 5 confirmed kills.

Biography
Stanisław Blok was born in 1916. His ancestors came to Gdańsk from Flanders. On 3 January 1939, he entered the Polish Air Force Academy in Dęblin where he trained on PWS-10 and PZL P.7.

After the September Campaign, he was evacuated to the UK via Romania. After training he was assigned to the No. 315 Polish Fighter Squadron in 1941. On 19 August 1941, Blok scored his first victory on a Bf 109 near Dunkirk. On 21 September over Fruges, he shot down a Bf 109 and damaged another one. In the same year, he was promoted podporucznik (pilot officer). He served briefly with No. 603 Squadron RAF in early 1942, moving onto No. 54 Squadron RAF in April of that year. He returned to No. 315 in December 1942.

During World War II, Stanisław Blok downed five aircraft and one flying bomb V-1.

Awards
 Virtuti Militari, Silver Cross
 Cross of Valour (Poland), three times
 Distinguished Flying Cross (United Kingdom)

References

Further reading

 Tadeusz Jerzy Krzystek, Anna Krzystek: Polskie Siły Powietrzne w Wielkiej Brytanii w latach 1940-1947 łącznie z Pomocniczą Lotniczą Służbą Kobiet (PLSK-WAAF). Sandomierz: Stratus, 2012, s. 98. 
 Jerzy Pawlak: Absolwenci Szkoły Orląt: 1925-1939. Warszawa: Retro-Art, 2009, s. 261. 
 Piotr Sikora: Asy polskiego lotnictwa. Warszawa: Oficyna Wydawnicza Alma-Press. 2014, s. 360-366. 
 Józef Zieliński: Asy polskiego lotnictwa. Warszawa: Agencja lotnicza ALTAIR, 1994, s. 65.

External links
 

Polish World War II flying aces
Recipients of the Silver Cross of the Virtuti Militari
1994 deaths
1916 births
Recipients of the Distinguished Flying Cross (United Kingdom)